Geminiano T. de Ocampo was a Filipino ophthalmologist known to some as the "Father of Modern Philippine Ophthalmology". He was the founder of the Philippine Eye Bank. He graduated valedictorian of his class at the Bulacan High School in 1926.

He established the first eye hospital in the Philippines, De Ocampo Eye Hospital (1952) and the first Filipino President of the Philippine Ophthalmological Society (1958). He was the first Filipino to design a corneal dissector that was manufactured in the US. He received the Jose Rizal Medal in Ophthalmology from the Asia Pacific Academy of Ophthalmology and was named National Scientist of the Philippines in 1982.

References

External links
womenofmalolos.org
upmasa-online.org
nast.dost.gov.ph

Filipino ophthalmologists
People from Malolos
Burials at the Libingan ng mga Bayani
Year of birth missing
Year of death missing
20th-century Filipino medical doctors
National Scientists of the Philippines